The 2006 Formula BMW UK season was the third Formula BMW season based in United Kingdom whose mission was to develop talented young drivers and introduce them to auto racing using full-size cars. The series was part of the support race package for the BTCC.

Teams and drivers
All cars were Mygale FB02 chassis powered by BMW engines. Guest drivers in italics.

2006 Race calendar and winners

Races

Drivers

External links
 formula1.cc

Formula BMW seasons
Formula BMW UK
BMW UK